Sierra Sky Park may refer to:
Sierra Sky Park, California
Sierra Sky Park Airport